CMC may refer to:

Education

Bangladesh 
 Chittagong Medical College or Chittagong Medical College Hospital, a public medical college in Chittagong
 Comilla Medical College,  a public medical college in Comilla

India 
 Government Medical College, Kozhikode, Kerala, Previously known as Calicut Medical College
 Christian Medical College & Hospital, Vellore, Tamil Nadu
 Christian Medical College Ludhiana, Punjab
 Coimbatore Medical College, Coimbatore, Tamil Nadu

Nepal 
 Chitwan Medical College, Bharatpur, Chitwan

Pakistan 
 Chandka Medical College, Larkana, Sindh
 Continental Medical College, Lahore, Punjab

United Kingdom 
 Cambridge Muslim College, Islamic higher education institution in Cambridge

United States 
 Chicago Musical College, a division of Chicago College of Performing Arts at Roosevelt University
 Claremont McKenna College, a liberal arts college in Claremont, California
 Colorado Mountain College, a network of seven community colleges in western Colorado
 Computer Music Center, the oldest center for electronic and computer music research in the United States
 Copper Mountain College, a community college in Joshua Tree, California
 Clackamas Middle College, a middle school in Oregon

Television 
 Cable Music Channel, a defunct music television channel from Turner Broadcasting System, U.S.
 California Music Channel or CMC-TV, an American music video service
 Country Music Channel, an defunct Australian music television channel provided by Foxtel
 Croatian Music Channel, a Croatian television channel broadcasting Croatian music and music of Croatian production
 Cutie Mark Crusaders, a trio of fillies searching for their cutie marks in the animated series My Little Pony: Friendship Is Magic

Military 
 Central Military Commission (China)
 Central Military Commission of the Workers' Party of Korea
 Central Military Commission of the Communist Party of Vietnam
 Chairman of the NATO Military Committee, Chairman of NATO's Military Committee
 Command Master Chief, the senior enlisted man aboard a US Navy or US Coast Guard vessel
 Commandant of the Marine Corps, the highest-ranking officer of the United States Marine Corps

Organizations

International 
 Carnegie Moscow Center, a non-profit think tank and regional affiliate of the Carnegie Endowment for International Peace
 Cluster Munition Coalition, an international civil society movement campaigning against the use of cluster munitions
 CMC Markets, an international financial company
 Compact Model Council, a working group in the EDA industry
 COMSAT mobile communications, a telecommunications company

Australia 
 Cultural Ministers Council, an Australian intergovernmental organisation for ministers of culture and the arts that existed from 1984-2011

Canada 
 Canadian Meat Council, Canada's national trade association for the federally inspected red meat packers and processors
 Canadian Meteorological Centre, a provider of forecast guidance to national and regional prediction centres
 Christian Mennonite Conference, a small body of Mennonites in western Canada
 CMC Electronics, a Canadian electronics company

Mainland China 
 China National Machinery Import and Export Corporation
 China Media Capital

Taiwan 
 Central Mint, a subsidiary of the Central Bank of the Republic of China
 Chi Mei Corporation, plastics producer in Taiwan
 China Motor Corporation, a Taiwanese manufacturer of automobiles
 CMC Magnetics, a Taiwanese company, one of world's largest optical disc manufacturers

United States 
 Carolinas Medical Center, a hospital in the Charlotte, North Carolina region
 Catholic Medical Center, a hospital and heart disease institute located in Manchester, New Hampshire
 Central Massachusetts Conference, a high school athletic conference organised by Massachusetts Interscholastic Athletic Association
 Children's Museum of Cleveland
 Civic Media Center, an alternative library and reading room in Gainesville, Florida
 Colorado Mountain Club, a nonprofit outdoor recreation and education organization
 Colt's Manufacturing Company, an American firearms manufacturer
 Commercial Metals Company, a steel and metal manufacturer based in Irving, Texas
 Conservative Mennonite Conference, a Christian body of conservative evangelical Mennonite churches
 CMC Materials Inc, a chemicals company that was purchased by Entegris in 2022

Other countries 
 Caribbean Media Corporation, a Barbados-based centralised content-provider
 Catholic Medical Center, the eight hospitals attached to the Catholic University of Korea
 CMC (company), an Indian information technology service
 CMC, marketer of coal from the Cerrejón mine in northern Colombia, owned by Anglo American, BHP and Glencore, headquartered in Dublin.
 Colombo Municipal Council, the local council for Colombo, Sri Lanka
 Congregation of the Mother Co-Redemptrix, a Vietnamese Roman Catholic religious order
 Cooper Motor Corporation, a car manufacturer in Kenya
 Cyprus Mines Corporation, an early 20th century American mining company based in Cyprus

Chemistry 
 Carboxymethyl cellulose, a cellulose derivative often initialized CMC
 Ceramic matrix composite,  a subgroup of composite materials as well as a subgroup of technical ceramics
 Chemistry, manufacturing and control, a drug development process
 Chlormadinone caproate, a progestin that was never marketed
 Critical micelle concentration, the concentration of surfactants above which micelles are spontaneously formed

Computing 
 CBC-mask-CBC, a block cipher mode of operation for encrypting hard disks
 Central Management and Control, enterprise data management software for Cruzer Enterprise secure USB drives
 Certificate Management over CMS, an internet standard by the IETF
 Common Messaging Calls, an API client for the Messaging Application Programming Interface
 Community multimedia center or telecentre
 Computer-mediated communication, any form of data exchange across two or more networked computers
 Constraint Monte Carlo algorithm that uses random sampling for computer simulations

Other uses 
 CMC (basketball), Cercle Municipal de Casablanca, a basketball club in Casablanca, Morocco
 CMC Cup, international Go tournament
 California Men's Colony, a male-only state prison in California, USA
 Canadian Music Centre, a music venue
 Carpometacarpal joint, a joint in the wrist that articulates the carpal bones and the metacarpals
 Certified Management Consultant, an international professional certification for professional management consultants
 Certified Master Chef, the highest level of culinary certification by the American Culinary Federation
 Certified mortgage consultant, a professional certification for mortgage professionals
 Cincinnati Museum Center at Union Terminal, a museum in Cincinnati, Ohio, originally used as a train station
 Christian McCaffrey, American football running back 
 C-M-C', a form of commodity trade in the theory of Karl Marx
 CMC International, a record label based near London, United Kingdom
 Commonwealth Code, the territorial law of the Northern Mariana Islands 
 Conditional mean closure, a combustion model for CFD
 Constant mean curvature, a differential-geometric property of some surfaces
 Crime and Misconduct Commission, an independent entity in Queensland Government, Australia, created to combat major crime
 Cuban Missile Crisis, a 13-day confrontation between the U.S. and the Soviet Union
 Chronic mucocutaneous candidiasis, an immune disorder characterized by chronic infections with Candida
 CMC, initials of Welsh singer Charlotte Church (b. 1986) as used on "The Opera Song (Brave New World)"
 Common-mode choke, in electronics special type of choke